Raffi Cavoukian,  (born July 8, 1948), known professionally by the mononym Raffi, is a Canadian singer-lyricist and author of Armenian descent born in Egypt, best known for his children's music. He developed his career as a "global troubadour" to become a music producer, author, entrepreneur, and founder of the Raffi Foundation for Child Honouring, a vision for global restoration.

Early life
Raffi was born in Cairo, Egypt, to Armenian parents who fled Turkey during the Armenian genocide. In 1958, his family immigrated to Canada, eventually settling in Toronto, Ontario. His mother named him after the Armenian novelist Raffi. His father, Arto Cavoukian, was a well-known portrait photographer with a studio on Bloor Street in Toronto. His older brother, Onnig Cavoukian, known as Cavouk, is also a famous portrait photographer. His younger sister is Ann Cavoukian, Ontario's former Information and Privacy Commissioner. His parents died within twelve hours of each other, his mother dying first of abdominal cancer. He visited Soviet Armenia once in 1972.

In the early 1970s, Raffi frequented a Toronto guitar store near Yonge and Wellesley called Millwheel, where he met other developing Canadian musicians such as David Wilcox and John Lacey. He befriended Lacey, a folk guitarist from Oakville, Ontario, who helped Raffi improve his finger picking. Raffi continued playing folk guitar in coffee houses in Toronto and Montréal before hitchhiking to Vancouver in 1972 to find "fame and fortune".

He returned to Toronto a few years later and was invited to sing for a Toronto public school. Despite his hesitations about singing for kids, he was an immediate success, and thus began his career entertaining children.

Career

Children's entertainer
Once called "the most popular children's singer in the English-speaking world", he is well loved by many children born in the 1970s, 1980s and 1990s for his popular children's songs. His autobiography, The Life of a Children's Troubadour, documents the first part of his award-winning career. Some of Raffi's best-known children's songs are "Baby Beluga", "Bananaphone", "All I Really Need", and "Down by the Bay".

Most of Raffi's children's albums include small, simple, folk instrumentations featuring Raffi's vocal and guitar work. Early works included contributions from Toronto-area folk musicians, including Ken Whiteley, The Honolulu Heartbreakers, and Bruce Cockburn. Raffi also incorporated many world music sounds into his records, including "Sambalele" (More Singable Songs, 1977) and "Anansi" (The Corner Grocery Store, 1979).

In 1989, his album Raffi In Concert With The Rise And Shine Band was listed on the RPM Top 100 Albums chart.

After a seven-year gap in publishing, Raffi released an album, Let's Play, in 2002. He moved to Saltspring Island near Victoria, British Columbia, in 2008.

Raffi is a member of the Canadian charity Artists Against Racism.

He is currently the president of Troubadour Music Inc., a triple-bottom-line company he founded to produce and promote his work. He released recording for a number of other artists, including Caitlin Hanford and Chris Whiteley.

As of 2017, Raffi continues to perform and appears occasionally across Canada and the United States. His most recent album is "Nursery Rhymes For Kinder Times", a collaboration album with Lindsay Munroe which was released in 2022.

Advocacy
Raffi's recent musical work focuses on social and environmental causes and appeals to the generation who grew up with his children's music ("Beluga Grads") to effect change in the world. He also promotes those causes through his books, academic lectures and as a speaker. In 2007, Raffi wrote, recorded and produced the single "Cool It", a rockabilly "call to action" on global warming with Dr. David Suzuki in the chorus. "Cool It" was the theme song for Dr. Suzuki's recent Canadian tour to promote action on climate change. In February 2016, Raffi released the song "Wave of Democracy" in support of American Senator Bernie Sanders run to be the Democratic nominee for US Presidency. In September 2019 he released song "Young People Marching", which was written for Greta Thunberg.

Child Honouring
In the 21st century, Raffi has devoted himself to "Child Honouring," his vision for creating a humane and sustainable world by addressing the universal needs of children. The Child Honouring ethic is described as a "vision, an organizing principle, and a way of life—a revolution in values that calls for a profound redesign of every sphere of society." His "Covenant for Honouring Children" outlines the principles of this philosophy.

In 2006, with Dr. Sharna Olfman, he co-edited an anthology, Child Honouring: How to Turn This World Around, which introduces Child Honouring as a philosophy for restoring communities and ecosystems. It contains chapters by Penelope Leach, Fritjof Capra, David Korten, Riane Eisler, Mary Gordon, Graça Machel, Joel Bakan, Matthew Fox, Barbara Kingsolver, Jean-Daniel Ó Donncada, and others. The book's foreword is by the 14th Dalai Lama. The musical album Resisto Dancing: Songs of Compassionate Revolution was released as a tie-in for the book.

In a 2006 speech, Iona Campagnolo, Lieutenant Governor of British Columbia, referred to Child Honouring as a "vast change in the human paradigm."

Raffi advocates for a child's right to live free of commercial exploitation and he has consistently refused all commercial endorsement offers. Raffi's company has never directly advertised nor marketed to children. In 2005, he sent an open letter to Ted Rogers of Rogers Wireless, urging them to stop marketing cell phones to children. He also turned down a film proposal for "Baby Beluga" because of the nature of the funding, which was based on exploitative advertising and marketing.

Raffi has been hailed for his work as "Canada's all time children's champion".

In October 2006, Raffi was presented with the Fred Rogers Integrity Award by the Campaign for a Commercial-Free Childhood at the Judge Baker Children's Center in Boston, for his consistent refusal to use his music in endorsements that market products directly to children.

In 2012, after learning details surrounding the online bullying, exploitation and ultimate suicide of teenager Amanda Todd, Raffi and his Raffi Foundation for Child Honouring co-founded the Red Hood Project with business owner, former Crown prosecutor, community and arts philanthropist and advocate Sandy Garossino and design professional, writer, educator and community activist Mark Busse. Red Hood Project is a movement for consumer protection for children online that launched in November 2012.

In June 2013, Raffi published the book, Lightweb Darkweb: Three Reasons to Reform Social Media Before it Re-forms Us, which examines both the benefits and the dangers present on the internet and in social media.

Awards and memberships
 Order of Canada (1983)
 Order of British Columbia (2001)
 Doctor of Music, from the University of Victoria (honorary degree)
 Doctor of Letters, from the University of British Columbia (honorary degree)
 Doctor of Letters, from Wilfrid Laurier University (honorary degree)
 Fred Rogers Integrity Award (2006)
 Special Achievement Award at the SOCAN Awards in Toronto in 2000.
2010 Top 25 Canadian Immigrant Award Winner.
 Honorary Doctorate of Letters, Vancouver Island University (2014)

Works

Discography

Studio Albums
 Good Luck Boy (1975)
 Singable Songs for the Very Young (1976)
 Adult Entertainment (1977)
 More Singable Songs (1977)
 The Corner Grocery Store (1979)
 Baby Beluga (1980)
 Rise and Shine (1982)
 Raffi's Christmas Album (1983)
 One Light, One Sun (1985)
 Everything Grows (1987)
 Raffi in Concert with the Rise and Shine Band (1989)
 Evergreen Everblue (1990)
 Raffi on Broadway (1993)
 Bananaphone (1994)
 Raffi Radio (1995)
 Country Goes Raffi (2001) (tribute album)
 Let's Play (2002)
 Where We All Belong (2003)
 Song for the Dalai Lama (2004) (commemorative CD)
 Resisto Dancing – Songs of Compassionate Revolution (2006)
 Communion (2009)
 Love Bug (2014)
 Owl Singalong (2016)
 Dog on the Floor (2018)
 Nursery Rhymes For Kinder Times (with Lindsay Munroe) (2022)

Compilations 

 Raffi in Concert (1996)
 The Singable Songs Collection (1996)
 Raffi's Box of Sunshine (2000)
 Quiet Time (2006)
 Animal Songs (2008)
 Songs of Our World (2008)
 Fun Food Songs (2013)
 Best Of Raffi (2017)
 Motivational Songs (2019)

Singles

Singable Songs for the Very Young (1976)
"The More We Get Together"
"Down By the Bay"
"Brush Your Teeth"
"Robin in the Rain"
"I Wonder If I'm Growing"
"Bumping Up and Down"
"Willoughby Wallaby Woo"
"Spider on the Floor"
"Baa Baa Black Sheep"
"Peanut Butter Sandwich"
"The Sharing Song"
"Mr. Sun"

More Singable Songs (1977)
"Six Little Ducks"
"You Gotta Sing"
"Oh Me, Oh My!"
"He'll Be Coming Down the Chimney"
"Shake My Sillies Out"
"If I Had a Dinosaur"
"I've Been Working on the Railroad"

The Corner Grocery Store (1979)
"Knees Up Mother Brown"
"Cluck, Cluck, Red Hen"
"My Way Home"
"Anansi"
"The Corner Grocery Store"
"Y A Un Rat"/"Sur le Pont d'Avignon"
"Going on a Picnic"
"Goodnight Irene"

Baby Beluga (1980)
"Baby Beluga"
"Day-O (The Banana Boat Song)"
"Thanks a Lot"
"All I Really Need"
"Morningtown Ride"

Rise and Shine (1982)
"Rise and Shine"
"Walk, Walk, Walk"
"The Wheels on the Bus"
"Daniel"
"Five Little Ducks"
"He's Got the Whole World"
"Big Beautiful Planet"
"I'm in the Mood"
"Something In My Shoe"
"This Little Light of Mine"

Raffi's Christmas Album (1983)
"Must Be Santa"
"Douglas Mountain"
"Every Little Wish"

One Light, One Sun (1985)
"Time to Sing"
"Apples and Bananas"
"Fais Dodo"
"Riding in an Airplane"
"Like Me and You"
"The Bowling Song"
"Tingalayo"
"De Colores"
"One Light, One Sun"
"Twinkle, Twinkle, Little Star"

Everything Grows (1987)
"Everything Grows"
"Bathtime"
"Just Like the Sun"
"Haru Ga Kita"
"Teddy Bear Hug"
"Eight Piggies in a Row"
"Let's Make Some Noise"

Evergreen Everblue (1990)
"Evergreen Everblue"
"Big Beautiful Planet"
"Clean Rain"

Non-Album Singles 

 On Hockey Days
 Wave of Democracy
 Song For Healing (featuring Lindsay Munroe)
 For All You Do (featuring Lindsay Munroe and Yo-Yo Ma)
 Young People Marching (for Greta Thunberg)

Filmography
 A Young Children's Concert with Raffi (1984)
 Raffi in Concert with the Rise and Shine Band (1988)
 Raffi on Broadway (1993)
 Raffi Renaissance (2007)

Bibliography

Adult
 The Life of a Children's Troubadour (2000)
 Child Honouring: How to Turn this World Around (2006)
 Lightweb Darkweb (2013)

Children
 Raffi Christmas Treasury (1988)
 Shake My Sillies Out (1988)
 Tingalayo (1988)
 Rise and Shine (1995)
 One Light, One Sun (1995)
 Like Me and You (1996)
 Spider on the Floor (1996)
 Baby Beluga (1997)
 This Little Light of Mine (1997)
 Wheels on the Bus (1998)
 Everything Grows (1998)
 Down by the Bay (1999)
 Five Little Ducks (1999)

References

Further reading
 Campagnola, Iona. "Campagnola says Child Honouring is a vast change in the human paradigm", "Child Honoring Luncheon" 2006-07-29. Retrieved on 14 March 2007.
 Cavoukian, Raffi. "Raffi's open letter to Ted Rogers asking not to market mobile phones to children", "Commercial Alert", 2005-08-30. Retrieved on 14 March 2007.
 Adilman, Sid, Toronto Star, "Coming of Age Canada's boom in recordings for kids has peaked. But shift is on to videos and CD-Roms", 10 March 1996
 Leiby, Richard, The Washington Post, "Raffi's Growing Pains", 31 May 1992.
 Appears as a parody, named Roofi, in an Episode of The Simpsons – "Marge vs. Singles, Seniors, Childless Couples and Teens, and Gays" (eighth episode of the fifteenth season)

External links

 RaffiNews.com
 Child Honouring
 
 "A Day in the Life" podcast about Raffi's career

1948 births
Living people
Egyptian people of Armenian descent
Egyptian emigrants to Canada
Canadian people of Armenian descent
Canadian children's musicians
Members of the Order of British Columbia
Members of the Order of Canada
Musicians from Toronto
Juno Award for Children's Album of the Year winners
20th-century Canadian male singers
Canadian singer-songwriters
Canadian folk guitarists
Canadian male guitarists
Fingerstyle guitarists
20th-century Canadian guitarists
21st-century Canadian guitarists
Shoreline Records artists
A&M Records artists
MCA Records artists
Rounder Records artists
Children's rights activists
Canadian male singer-songwriters
21st-century Canadian male singers